The steel industry is an established and growing industry in Bangladesh. Predominantly based in the port city of Chittagong, the industry has emerged as a major contributor to the national economy. According to the experts, the growth of steel industry in Bangladesh is mainly induced by the rapid expansion of the country's shipbuilding and real estate sector, as well as the major investments in various infrastructure projects throughout the country.

History 
The first ever steel mill was established  in 1952 by the H Akberali Group of Industries as the "Bangladesh Steel Re-rolling Mills (BSRM)". Located at Nasirabad, Chittagong, the plant formed re-enforcing bars and structural sections. The mill gradually prolonged, adopting new technological know-how by setting up a cross-nation European mill in 1987 which incorporated a wire-rod mill. The BSRM group added a captive billet manufacturing plants in 1996 so as to make sure a stable distribution of billets of its plants. In 2006, the company installed pilot cold rolling mill to make ribbed high strength wires.

By this time, KSRM Steel Plant Ltd emerged. Very recently, they have established Billet Plant at Chittagong. Their factory situated at Ghoramara, Sitakunda at Chittagong. KSRM is a steel manufacturing organization belonging to Kabir Group of Industries. One of the largest rolling mills in Bangladesh. Moreover, several other steel companies emerged in the country, most notably GPH Ispat, RRM (The Rani Re-rolling Mills LTD, Kabir Steel Re-rolling Mills, AKS, Anwar ISpat, HKG Steel Mills Ltd., Rahim Steel Mills LTD, Seema Steel Re-rolling Mills LTD, Bashundhara Steels etc.

Bangladesh Steel industry is emerging as one of the major industrial sectors of the country. It consists of small up to the largest scale of steel melting and re-rolling factories across the country that mostly produce deformed bar rod of different grade (40, 60, 500), angel, channel and coil for the construction industry. Though the history of Steel Industry is not older one but it can make a glorious future.
Before 1971 Bangladesh did not have any steel mill and even after the liberation there were only a few steel factories in the country. In 1990s the actual development began in this sector through a revolution. During that period the building constructing agencies or developer companies came forward to build modern infrastructure. Then with the increasing demand, new investors started investing in steel or rod production.
In 2012 we have almost 400 mills across the country including Dhaka, Chittagong. Although most of them are manual steel plants, 30 mills among them are automated.

Many steel producing companies have gained reputation as a brand. Among them Metrocem Ispat, Baizid Steel, GPH Ispat, BSRM, S.S. STEEL LIMITED, RSRM, KSRM, RRML, Anwar Steel, HKG Steel, AK Steel, Rahim Steel, Abul Khair Group are worth mentioning. Today the highest steel producing company is BSRM. They are doing business for 60 years. Their production is almost six and half lakh ton per year which meets 26% demand of the local market.
Now grade 60 rods are being slowly replaced by g500 rods which a number of rolling mills in our country are now manufacturing. With g500, the real estate builders and developers can also save minimum 15% further quantity of steel than g60.

Market 
The steel industry in Bangladesh is worth Tk 55,000 crore (US$7 billion). There are about 40 active manufacturers with a combined capacity to produce nine million tonnes of steel a year.

References

Bangladesh
Industry in Bangladesh